Preloge pri Konjicah is a small settlement in the Municipality of Slovenske Konjice in eastern Slovenia. It lies west of the town of Slovenske Konjice in the traditional region of Styria. The municipality is now included in the Savinja Statistical Region.

Name
The name of the settlement was changed from Preloge to Preloge pri Konjicah in 1953.

References

External links
Preloge pri Konjicah at Geopedia

Populated places in the Municipality of Slovenske Konjice